Part of the Game is the fifth album by the California soft rock group Pablo Cruise. The album marked a decline in the band's popularity, as it managed only to reach #39 in the United States. One single was released from the album: "I Want You Tonight", reaching #19 in the United States. The band called the album a transition into a blend of disco to take advantage of the extreme popularity of that type of music at the time.

Track listing

Side One
"Part Of The Game" (Jenkins, Lerios, Allee Willis, Day) - 3:44
"I Want You Tonight" (Jenkins, Lerios, Willis) - 5:31
"When Love Is At Your Door" (Jenkins, Lerios, Willis) - 4:31
"Givin' It Away" (Jenkins, Lerios, Willis) - 5:18

Side Two
"Tell Me That You Love Me" (Jenkins, Lerios, Willis) - 4:54
"Lonely Nights" (Jenkins, Lerios, Willis) - 5:23
"How Many Tears?" (Jenkins, Lerios, Willis, David Lasley) - 6:15
"For Another Town" (Lerios, Willis) - 4:28

Charts

Personnel
Pablo Cruise
David Jenkins - guitars, vocals
Steve Price - percussion, drums
Bruce Day - bass, Vocals
Cory Lerios - piano, keyboards, vocals
Additional musicians
Michael Boddicker, David Foster, Steve Porcaro - synthesizer
Gene Meros - saxophone

Production
Bill Schnee: Producer, Engineer

References

Pablo Cruise albums
1979 albums
A&M Records albums
Albums recorded at Sunset Sound Recorders
Albums produced by Bill Schnee